The Fiji men's national volleyball team represents Fiji in international volleyball competitions and friendly matches. The team is currently ranked 141st in the world. Fiji participates in the Pacific Games.

Current Team 
Fiji Team at the 2015 Pacific Games:
 Hanisi Moeva
 Aporosa Josaia Tamaicoci Salauca
 Nimilote Lua
 Farasiko Livai Qaqa
 Isaac Lee Ayub
 Ratu Ilaijia Buliciri Vou Vakayadra
 Jiuta Vateitei
 Peniasi Ratuki Senivuga
 Timoci Draunibaka Qio
 Paul Elai Strauss Vatucawaqa
 Inia Korowale
 Atonio Talemaimaleya

References

National sports teams of Fiji
National men's volleyball teams
Volleyball in Fiji
Men's sport in Fiji